Meristem Securities Limited is a Nigerian Capital Market Conglomerate regulated by the Securities and Exchange Commission (SEC) based in Lagos State, Nigeria. Formerly known as Great Africa Securities Limited founded in 2003, the company had a change of name to Meristem in 2005. The company has six subsidiaries; Meristem Stockbrokers, Meristem Wealth, Meristem Registrars and Probate Services, Meristem Capital, Meristem Trustees and Meristem Finance.

The company name is familiarized with an agricultural word. Meristem is the tissue in most plants containing undifferentiated cells (meristematic cells), found in zones of the plant where growth can take place. The organization reflects this in their slogan ‘Let’s grow wealth for you.’

In 2017, Meristem Stockbrokers Limited was responsible for 13.3 percent of the value of stocks traded on the floor of the Nigerian Stock Exchange.

Meristem Stockbrokers
Meristem Stock Brokers Limited (MSBL) is a wholly independent subsidiary of Meristem Securities Limited (MSL). MSBL operates under full licensing by the Securities and Exchange Commission(SEC) in Nigeria and is a member of the Nigerian Stock Exchange (NSE). In 2017, Meristem Stockbrokers ranked second 'by value of equities transactions' on the Nigerian Stock Exchange. In January 2018, Meristem Stockbrokers announced Mr Saheed Adewale Bashir as their new Managing Director/Chief Executive Officer who replaced Mr Oluwole Abegunde.

The company launched the first Online stock trading platform in Nigeria, MeriTrade.

MSBL has remained a leading player in Nigeria's competitive investment market with a solid reputation as a highly professional and client-centric brokerage firm. MSBL provides holistic stockbroking and research services to a wide array of clients across the African continent, Europe and USA. The company launched the first Online stock trading platform in Nigeria, MeriTrade and its demo simulation for learning MeriGame.

Meritrade
Meritrade is an online platform under Meristem Securities Limited and was incorporated in 2014. The platform allow users trade stock online on the Nigeria Stock Exchange. In 2016, the platform was voted the best online trading platform. Last year, Meritrade launched Merigame, a virtual game that allows users buy and sell stocks for fun.

MeriGame 

MeriGame is an investment game from MeriTrade by Meristem Securities that helps demystify the stock market process. The MeriGame platform is the exact replica of the stocks traded on the floor of the Nigerian Stock Exchange which enable traders learn how to buy stocks under real market conditions.

Meristem Wealth 
Meristem Wealth Management Limited (MWML) was incorporated in August 2008 as a wealth management company and was registered as a Fund and Portfolio Manager with the Securities and Exchange Commission (SEC).

The company transformed from the asset management and business advisory unit of Meristem Securities Limited into a fully-fledged Wealth Management Company and floated its first Mutual Fund worth 1 billion naira In 2015.

MWML currently manages an asset portfolio, Asset under Management (AUM) that has consistently grown over the years. AUM capitalisation currently stands in excess of 188 billion naira as at December 2017.

Meristem Capital 
Meristem Capital Limited (MCL) is the Investment Banking subsidiary of Meristem Securities Limited. MCL serves as a registered issuing house, a Designated Adviser on Alternative Securities Market (ASeM) and as a Financial Advisor.

As a Designated Adviser on the Alternative Securities Market (ASeM) on the Nigerian Stock Exchange, MCL is positioned to provide assistance to small and medium companies wishing to list on the ASeM board to benefit from the immense opportunities listing provides to SMEs.

Meristem Trustees 
Meristem Trustees is a subsidiary of Meristem Wealth Management Limited. The company was incorporated by the Corporate Affairs Commission as a Private Limited Liability Company in April 2012 and duly licensed by the Securities & Exchange Commission (SEC) to carry out the functions of Trustees in the Capital market in June 2012.

In 2015, the company launched Meristem Diaspora Trust, a product designed for Nigerians abroad with interests in having investments back home. Investment responsibilities are thus transferred to Meristem Trustee who represents and protect the interests of the owner with a view to ensuring that those objectives are achieved.

Meristem Registrars and Probate Services 
Meristem Registrars and Probate Services Limited (MRPSL) is a subsidiary of Meristem Securities Limited. MRPSL is a combination of two key service offerings; Registrars and Probate Service.

The company operates an automated Share registration services with state of the art technologies that offer efficient, accurate and reliable services to meet tailored client needs based on confidentiality policies while operating within industry requirements and regulatory guidelines.

As Probate Service provides, Meristem Registrars and Probate Services identified the need to fill the gap experienced in the estate administration space, and this served as the birthplace of Probate Management Service. The company is duly registered with the Securities and Exchange Commission (SEC)

Meristem Finance 
Meristem Finance Limited is the finance arm of the Meristem Securities Limited. The company commenced operations in October 2019. It is a non-banking financial institution and equipment leasing firm licensed by the Central Bank of Nigeria to provide financial services and a member of the Equipment Leasing Association of Nigeria (ELAN).

As a company with a reputable background, it is positioned to meet financing needs, ensuring that capital is deployed for the smooth-running operations and/or funding of clients’ business.

Leadership 

 Group Chairman - Ishaya Shekari
 Vice Chairman - Olusegun Olusanya  
 Group Managing Director - Oluwole Abegunde  
 Deputy Group Managing Director - Sulaiman Adedokun (CFA)
 Board Members - Christopher Attah, Yakubu Abubakar, Laitan Onolaja OFR, S.I.C Okoli, and Chief Michael Ade-Ojo.

References

External links 
 Meristem Securities Official Website
 Meritrade Official Website
 Meristem Stockbrokers Official Website
 Meristem Wealth Official Website

Financial capital
Investment companies of Nigeria
Companies based in Lagos
Financial services companies established in 2003
Nigerian companies established in 2003